The 1996 Salem Open was a men's tennis tournament played on outdoor hard courts on Hong Kong Island in Hong Kong and was part of the World Series of the 1996 ATP Tour. It was the 21st edition of the tournament and was held from 8 April through 14 April 1996. First-seeded Pete Sampras won the singles title.

Finals

Singles

 Pete Sampras defeated  Michael Chang 6–4, 3–6, 6–4
 It was Sampras' 3rd title of the year and the 52nd of his career.

Doubles

 Patrick Galbraith /  Andrei Olhovskiy defeated  Kent Kinnear /  Dave Randall 6–3, 6–7, 7–6
 It was Galbraith's 2nd title of the year and the 28th of his career. It was Olhovskiy's 3rd title of the year and the 15th of his career.

References

Salem Open
Hong Kong Open (tennis)
1996 in Hong Kong sport